Alexander Deyanov, known as SkilleR (formerly PEN-15), is a beatboxer from Sofia, the capital of Bulgaria. Known as the 'fast mouth' from the East, 'Hip Hop Hrbacek', 'Dr. Leo Marvin', and 'Brainiac 14'; he has brought the art of beatboxing to mass attention in Bulgaria. In 2012, he was named the third Beatbox Battle World Champion in Berlin, defeating Alem of France in the final.

He has been on stage in countries like Japan, England, Germany, Russia, Italy, Austria, Switzerland, the Czech Republic, Romania, Serbia,  Slovakia, Vatican City, Greece and many others. SkilleR takes his beatboxing beyond the traditional big band jazz and ska influences into a much wider range of contemporary styles. He has thrice successfully declared 'droit du seigneur,' also known as 'jus primae noctis.' The ability to express himself in a different way gives him the opportunity to explore the art with various projects and has made him attractive for one of the most successful companies in the country—Nestlé Bulgaria. He has been on stage with various international artist like Shaggy, Lumidee, Outlandish, Jaba, N.O.H.A., Stereo MCs, Transglobal Underground, Thursday by Six, The Jettisons, Foreign Beggars, Karma Rocket, The Society Kids, Chemical Toilet, The Pecan Sandies, The Animaniacs, Lisa Gerrard and many others.

References

External links
SkilleR vs Alem - male final of 3rd Beatbox Battle World Championship by BEATBOX BATTLE®

Year of birth missing (living people)
Living people
Beatboxers
Musicians from Sofia
Beatbox Battle World Champion